The Vaughns are an indie pop rock band from New Jersey.

History
The Vaughns are an indie pop rock band from Springfield, New Jersey that formed in 2014. The band attended high school together, and at the suggestion of their friends, began rehearsing together.

The Vaughns and tomfoolery (2014–2017)
The Vaughns released their debut EP, entitled The Vaughns, in August 2014. Their second EP tomfoolery was released on October 24, 2015, and the band notes "the main goal in recording tomfoolery was to capture the raw live sound." In 2016, the Vaughns' music was featured on the MTV show, Brothers Green Eat, and on the syndicated radio show, Little Steven's Underground Garage. That year, they also contributed to the Third Annual 24 Hour Songwriting Challenge, with the track "Vamos."

Singles and FOMO (2017–present)

The single "Santa Cruz" was released in 2017. In an interview with Consequence of Sound, Lies explains "when writing the song I was thinking about the contradictions between love as we see it in real life, and love as depicted in movies[;] when I look at great couples in my life I see something much lighter [and] so the thought was that maybe what we strive for in love should be more like that: consistent and warm." In 2018, the song "Coffee Sundae" was released, which is described as a "whimsical track [that] chronicles dealing with a romantic partner who is still in contact with their ex." The Vaughns performed at the North Jersey Indie Rock Festival, on October 6, 2018. Prior to the release of their debut album, The Vaughns released two more singles, "50%" and "Shout." On May 10, 2019, The Vaughns independently released their debut LP, FOMO.

In 2020, they signed with record label Equal Vision Records and released their third EP rom-coms + take-out the following year.

Current Lineup
Anna Lies – vocals, guitar and synth (2014–present)
Ryan Kenter – drums and percussion (2014–present)
Jordan Smith – guitar and vocals (2019-present)
Brian Hughes – bass and vocals (2020-present)

Former Members
Dave Cacciatore – guitar and vocals (2014-2019)
Tom Losito – bass and vocals (2014-2019)

Discography

Albums
FOMO (2019)

EPs
The Vaughns (2014)
tomfoolery (2015)
rom coms + take out (2021)

Singles
"Santa Cruz" (2017)
"Bby Save Me" (2017)
"BYKTWD" (2018)
"Coffee Sundae" (2018)
"50%" (2019)
"Shout" (2019)
"Raina" (2021)

References

Citations

Bibliography

Indie rock musical groups from New Jersey
Musical groups established in 2014
Sniffling Indie Kids artists
2014 establishments in New Jersey